Paudie Lynch (born 1952 in Beaufort, County Kerry) is an Irish former Gaelic footballer who played for Beaufort and at senior level for the Kerry county team between 1972 and 1982.

References

1952 births
Living people
All Stars Awards winners (football)
Beaufort Gaelic footballers
Gaelic football backs
Kerry inter-county Gaelic footballers
Munster inter-provincial Gaelic footballers
Winners of five All-Ireland medals (Gaelic football)